Clarice is a female given name, an anglicization of the French Clarisse, derived from the Latin and Italian name Clarissa, originally used in reference to the nuns of the Roman Catholic Order of St. Clare, whose own name ultimately derives from  ("clear" and "bright").

It may refer to:

People

Pre-modern world
 Clarice Orsini (1450–1488), wife of Lorenzo de' Medici and mother of Pope Leo X
 Clarice de' Medici (1493–1528), noblewoman from Florence, granddaughter of Lorenzo de' Medici

Modern world
 Clarice Assad (born 1978), Brazilian composer
 Clarice Beckett (1887–1935), Australian painter
 Clarice Benini (1905–1976), Italian chess master
 Clarice Blackburn (1921–1995), American actress
 Clarice Carson (1929–2015), Canadian opera singer
 Clarice Cliff (1899–1972), British ceramic artist
 Clarice Lispector (1920–1977), Brazilian writer
 Clarice Mayne (1886–1966), English actress
 Clarice McLean (born 1936), American dancer
 Clarice Modeste-Curwen (born 1945), Grenadian politician
 Clarice Morant (1904–2009), American centenarian and caretaker
 Clarice Phelps, African-American nuclear chemist
 Clarice Shaw (1883–1946), Scottish politician
 Clarice Taylor (1917–2011), American actress
 Clarice Tinsley (born 1954), American journalist
 Clarice Vance (1870–1961), American actress

Fictional characters
Milady "Clarice" de Winter, one of the main antagonists of The Three Musketeers
 The protagonist of the Clarice Bean series of children's books by English writer Lauren Child
 Clarice di Lanza, a character in the Arcana Heart video game series
 Clarice Ferguson, alter ego of Blink, a Marvel Comics superheroine
 Clarice Pendragon, sister of Emma Pendragon from Rugrats
 Clarice Starling, in the Hannibal Lecter series
 Clarice, a character in Sesame Street
 Clarice, a reindeer in the Rudolph the Red-Nosed Reindeer TV special

See also
 Clara (given name)
 Clare (given name)

English feminine given names
English-language feminine given names
Feminine given names